is a railway station operated by JR West on the Sanyō Main Line in Hikari, Yamaguchi. The station is located in the Nijigahama area of Hikari, on the northwest side of the city.  is located nearby.

History
April 11, 1912: Station opens, named Nijigahama Station (虹ヶ浜駅)
February 1, 1941: Station is renamed "Hikari Station"
July 5, 1983: Present station building is constructed
April 1, 1987: Station operation is taken over by JR West after privatization of Japanese National Railways
April 2, 1994: Monument art in the station square is completed

Layout
The station has five tracks, with two tracks devoted to passenger use. The tracks are numbered 2–6, since track 1 was removed for handicap access construction. The station building connects directly to an island platform where track 2 is found. Track 3 also has been removed. Tracks 5 and 6 are served by the second island platform. The station building is located on the south side of the station, and the crossover connecting the two platforms is on the east side of the station.

Platforms

See also
 List of railway stations in Japan

External links

  

Railway stations in Japan opened in 1912
Sanyō Main Line
Hiroshima City Network
Railway stations in Yamaguchi Prefecture
Hikari, Yamaguchi